10th CDG Awards
February 19, 2008

Contemporary: 
 Blades of Glory 

Fantasy: 
 The Golden Compass 

Period: 
 Sweeney Todd 
The 10th Costume Designers Guild Awards, honouring the best costume designs in film and television for 2007, were given in 2008. The nominees were announced on January 17, 2008.

Winners and nominees

Film

Contemporary
 Blades of Glory - Julie Weiss
 The Diving Bell and the Butterfly - Olivier Bériot
 Into the Wild - Mary Claire Hannan
 Juno - Monique Prudhomme
 Ocean's Thirteen - Louise Frogley

Fantasy Film
 The Golden Compass - Ruth Myers
 300 - Michael Wilkinson
 Enchanted - Mona May
 Harry Potter and the Order of the Phoenix - Jany Temime
 Pirates of the Caribbean: At World's End - Penny Rose

Period Film
 Sweeney Todd: The Demon Barber of Fleet Street - Colleen Atwood
 3:10 to Yuma - Arianne Phillips
 Atonement - Jacqueline Durran
 Elizabeth: The Golden Age - Alexandra Byrne
 La Vie en Rose (La môme) - Marit Allen (posthumous)

Television

Contemporary Series
 Ugly Betty - Eduardo Castro
 Big Love - Chrisi Karvonides-Dushenko
 Dancing with the Stars - Randall Christensen
 Entourage - Amy Westcott
 The Sopranos - Juliet Polcsa

Period or Fantasy Series
 Pushing Daisies - Robert Blackman
 Rome - April Ferry
 The Tudors - Joan Bergin

Miniseries or TV Film
 Bury My Heart at Wounded Knee - Mario Davignon
 Jane Eyre - Andrea Galer
 The Starter Wife - Marion Boyce and Debra McGuire

Costume Designers Guild Awards
2007 film awards
2007 television awards
2007 guild awards
2007 in fashion
2008 in American cinema
2008 in American television